is a fishing-themed medal game based on the Antarctic Adventure series released by Konami in 1991 in Japan along with Ballon Penta and Imo Hori Penta. It also was made as a Redemption game named Super Fisherman Penta and the mobile-based game Penta no Tsuri Bōken, which was available only on Konami's now defunct KonamiNet DX service. All of these were released in Japan only as well.

See also 
 Penta no Tsuri Bōken

References

External links 
 Arcade Flyer Game at The Arcade Flyer Archive
 Gameplay Video at YouTube

1991 video games
Konami games
Fishing video games